"The Happiest Place in Town" is a song by Australian rock/pop group Do-Ré-Mi released by Virgin Records in May 1988 as the fourth and final single, from their second studio album The Happiest Place in Town. 

The photograph on the artwork features a shot of an old style pinball parlour with the phrase "the happiest place in town" on the awning. The parlour was located on George Street in Sydney, not far from Broadway.

Track listing
"The Happiest Place in Town" (Dorland Bray, Stephen Philip)
"Take Me Anywhere" (Bray, Helen Carter, Philip)

Personnel
Do-Ré-Mi members
Dorland Bray — drums, percussion, backing vocals
Helen Carter — bass guitar, backing vocals
Deborah Conway — lead vocalist
Stephen Philip — guitar

Recording details

Producer — Martin Rushent

References

1988 singles
Do-Re-Mi (band) songs
1988 songs
Virgin Records singles
Song recordings produced by Martin Rushent